ITW David Speer Academy (colloquially, Speer Academy) is a public four-year charter high school in the Belmont Cragin neighborhood in Chicago, Illinois. It is a part of the Noble Network of Charter Schools.  It is named after David B. Speer, the former Chairman of Illinois Tool Works (ITW). The school opened in 2014.

External links
ITW David Speer School History and Campus Overview
Debate 

2014 establishments in Illinois
Noble Network of Charter Schools
Educational institutions established in 2014
Public high schools in Chicago